The Rhabdidae are scaphopod members of the same molluscan family, belonging to the order Dentaliida.  It includes only one genus, Rhabdus, and five species, as follows:

Rhabdus aequatorius (Pilsbry & Sharp, 1897)
Rhabdus dalli (Pilsbry & Sharp, 1897)
Rhabdus perceptus (Mabille & Rochebrune, 1889)
Rhabdus rectius (Carpenter, 1864)
Rhabdus toyamaense (Kuroda & Kikuchi, 1933)

References

Scaphopods